Valerie Joy Rutter née Valerie Harrison (born 1954), is a female former athlete who competed for England.

Athletics career
Rutter became the 1974 National champion (under her maiden name of Harrison) after winning the British AAA high jump championship.

She represented England in the high jump event, at the 1974 British Commonwealth Games in Christchurch, New Zealand. Four years later she represented England again in the high jump event, at the 1978 Commonwealth Games in Edmonton, Alberta, Canada.

References

1954 births
English female high jumpers
Athletes (track and field) at the 1974 British Commonwealth Games
Living people
Athletes (track and field) at the 1978 Commonwealth Games
Commonwealth Games competitors for England